EP, ep, or Ep may refer to:

Arts and entertainment

Music 
 Extended play, a recording that contains more than a single, but less than a full album
 Electric piano
 Entity Paradigm, a Pakistani rock band
 EP (The 77s EP), 1999
 EP (Beth Ditto EP), 2011
 EP (Childish Gambino EP), 2011
 EP (Crystal Antlers EP), 2008
 EP (The Fiery Furnaces album), 2005
 EP (The Format EP), 2002
 EP (Luna EP), 1996
 EP (Matchbox Twenty EP), 2003
 EP (Mogwai EP), 1999
 (The EP), an EP by Owen, 2004
 The EP (3for3 EP), 2015
 The EP (Frank n Dank album), 2007
 E.P., an EP by Alkaline Trio, 2020
 EP, an EP by Hope & Social, 2008
 EP, an EP by Red Flag, 1996

Other uses in arts and entertainment
 EP Daily, an entertainment-media news TV show
 Episode, sometimes abbreviated as Ep or ep
 Executive producer, a non-technical producer of an entertainment production

Businesses and organisations

Government and politics
 English Partnerships, a former English urban regeneration agency
 Estradas de Portugal, a Portuguese roads agency
 European Parliament, the European Union's directly elected assembly

Other businesses and organizations
 Editorial Photographers, a member of Imagery Alliance
 El Paso Corp. (NYSE stock symbol), a US natural gas producer
 Iran Aseman Airlines (IATA code)
 Europa Press (news agency), a news agency
 Euromaidan Press, a Ukrainian news website

Places
 Eden Prairie, Minnesota, US
 El Paso, Texas, US
 Ep, Kentucky, US
 Edgeley Park, Stockport, UK
 East Providence, Rhode Island, US

Science, technology, and mathematics

Biology and medicine
 Ectopic pregnancy
 Electrophysiology, the study of the electrical properties of biological cells and tissues
 Erythropoietin, a hormone
 Evoked potential, a stimulation induced electrophysiological test
 Etoposide and platinum agent (cisplatin), a chemotherapy regimen

Transportation
 Extreme pressure additive, a lubricant additive
 Estimated position, a navigation term
 Electric locomotive (Polish train designation: EP)
 English Premium brake, an abbreviation for the electro-pneumatic brake system on British railway trains

Other uses in science, technology, and mathematics
 Electrically powered spacecraft propulsion
 EPDM rubber, a synthetic ethylene-propylene-based rubber
 Equivalent person, a concept used in sanitary engineering (also called population equivalent)
 Expectation propagation, a technique in Bayesian machine learning
 Potential energy

Other uses
 En passant (e.p.), a chess move
 Europa-Park, a theme park in Germany
 Environmental Professional, as provided by ECO Canada
 Ecumenical Patriarchate of Constantinople, an Eastern Orthodox Christian Church headquartered in Istanbul

See also
 Extended play (disambiguation)
 EP1 (disambiguation)
 EP2 (disambiguation)
 EP3 (disambiguation)